William R. Pelham (December 24, 1845 or December 8, 1847 – March 30, 1933) was a Union Navy sailor during the American Civil War and a recipient of the United States military's highest decoration—the Medal of Honor—for his actions at the Battle of Mobile Bay.

Biography
On August 5, 1864, the Hartford participated in the Battle of Mobile Bay, Alabama. Five months after the battle, on December 31, 1864, Pelham was issued the Medal of Honor for his conduct in that action.

Pelham died at age 85 or 87 and was buried in Holy Cross Cemetery, Brooklyn, New York.

Medal of Honor citation

Rank and Organization: Landsman, U.S. Navy. Born: Halifax, Nova Scotia. Enlisted in: Nova Scotia. G.O. No.: 45, December 31, 1864.

Citation:

On board the flagship U.S.S. Hartford during successful actions against Fort Morgan, rebel gunboats and the ram  in Mobile Bay, 5 August 1864. When the other members of his guncrew were killed or wounded under the enemy's terrific shellfire, Pelham calmly assisted the casualties below and voluntarily returned and took his place at an adjoining gun where another man had been struck down. He continued to fight his gun throughout the remainder of the battle which resulted in the capture of the Tennessee.

See also

List of American Civil War Medal of Honor recipients: M–P

Notes

References

http://www.irishtimes.com/opinion/letters/online-parish-records-a-boon-for-researchers-1.2424460

1840s births
1933 deaths
19th-century Irish people
People from County Kerry
United States Navy Medal of Honor recipients
Union Navy sailors
American Civil War recipients of the Medal of Honor
Irish emigrants to the United States (before 1923)
Irish-born Medal of Honor recipients